Hsieh Su-wei was the defending champion, but lost in the second round to Zhang Shuai.

Zhang went on to win her first WTA title, defeating Vania King in the final 7–6(7–1), 6–1.

Seeds

Draw

Finals

Top half

Bottom half

Qualifying

Seeds

Qualifiers

Qualifying draw

First qualifier

Second qualifier

Third qualifier

Fourth qualifier

Fifth qualifier

Sixth qualifier

External links
 Main draw
 Qualifying draw

2013 Singles
Guangzhou International Women's Open Singles
Guangzhou International Women's Open Singles